Ladina Jenny (born 10 June 1993) is a Swiss snowboarder, specializing in alpine snowboarding.

Jenny competed at the 2014 Winter Olympics for Switzerland. She was 12th in the qualifying run of the parallel giant slalom, then lost her 1/8 final to Canada's Marianne Leeson, finishing 14th overall. In the parallel slalom she was 24th in qualifying, not advancing.

Jenny made her World Cup debut in January 2010. As of September 2014, her best finish is 6th, in a parallel slalom at Bad Gastein in 2013–14. Her best overall finish is 19th, in 2013–14.

References

External links

1993 births
Living people
Olympic snowboarders of Switzerland
Snowboarders at the 2014 Winter Olympics
Snowboarders at the 2018 Winter Olympics
Snowboarders at the 2022 Winter Olympics
People from Glarus
Swiss female snowboarders
21st-century Swiss women